Pál Tuska (born 29 January 1957) is a Hungarian equestrian. He competed in the team eventing at the 1996 Summer Olympics.

References

External links
 

1957 births
Living people
Hungarian male equestrians
Olympic equestrians of Hungary
Equestrians at the 1996 Summer Olympics
People from Törökszentmiklós
Sportspeople from Jász-Nagykun-Szolnok County